Another Atmosphere Preview is the fifth EP by American electronic duo VersaEmerge released on July 31, 2012 as a digital download. The song "Burn" was added on March 26, 2013. The EP is their last piece of content released as VersaEmerge before  changing their name to Versa.

Track list

References

2012 EPs
Versa (band) EPs
Fueled by Ramen EPs